Moisès Broggi i Vallès (18 May 1908 - 31 December 2012) was a Catalan physician and pacifist. Broggi studied medicine at University of Barcelona. He worked as a field surgeon in the Spanish Civil War for the International Brigades.

Awards
Creu de Sant Jordi (1981)

References

External links
 

1908 births
2012 deaths
Spanish centenarians
Men centenarians
20th-century Spanish physicians
Spanish pacifists
University of Barcelona alumni
International Brigades personnel